Markus Naglestad (born 26 April 1991) is a Norwegian footballer who currently plays for Chattanooga FC in the National Independent Soccer Association.

Career 
Naglestad started his career as a youth at Våg. He had a short spell with IK Start in 2006.

He featured for Våg in the 3. divisjon – the 4th tier of Norwegian football – in 2009 and 2010. As a 19-year-old, he moved to the US for studies. There he was voted both East Coast Conference Men's Soccer Offensive Player of the Year, and Rookie of the Year, by the league's coaches after his first season out of two seasons with Bridgeport Purple Knights of the NCAA Division II. He then spent two seasons with Providence Friars of NCAA Division I, before being drafted by New York City of Major League Soccer on 20 January 2015, but failed to sign a contract due to a knee injury.

On 9 November 2018, Naglestad signed with Egersunds IK for the 2019 season. 

In August 2020 he signed with Hartford Athletic of the USL Championship.

On 16 February 2021, Naglestad signed with National Independent Soccer Association side Chattanooga FC ahead of the Spring 2021 season.

Career statistics

References

External links 
 

1991 births
Living people
Norwegian footballers
Norwegian expatriate footballers
Providence Friars men's soccer players
AC Connecticut players
Sandefjord Fotball players
Norwegian expatriate sportspeople in the United States
Expatriate soccer players in the United States
New York City FC draft picks
USL League Two players
Eliteserien players
Hamarkameratene players
IL Hødd players
Egersunds IK players
Hartford Athletic players
Chattanooga FC players
Norwegian Second Division players
Association football forwards
Sportspeople from Kristiansand
Bridgeport Purple Knights men's soccer players
FK Donn (men) players
IF Fram Larvik players
National Independent Soccer Association players
IK Start players
SK Gjøvik-Lyn players
Norwegian Third Division players
Norwegian Fourth Division players
USL Championship players